The 2014 Atlantic 10 men's basketball tournament was played March 12–16 at the Barclays Center in Brooklyn, New York. This was a 13 team tournament with the addition of George Mason. The top 11 seeds got the first round bye and the top 4 seeds got a double bye. The 2014 tournament champion received an automatic bid to the 2014 NCAA tournament.  The 2014 championship game was nationally televised on CBS for the fourth straight year. The Saint Joseph's Hawks defeated the VCU Rams 65-61 in the championship to earn an automatic bid to the 2014 NCAA tournament.

Seeds
Teams are seeded by record within the conference, with a tiebreaker system to seed teams with identical conference records.

Schedule

*Game times in Eastern Time. #Rankings denote tournament seeding.

Bracket

See also
2014 Atlantic 10 women's basketball tournament

References

Atlantic 10 men's basketball tournament
2013–14 Atlantic 10 Conference men's basketball season
Basketball in New York City
College sports in New York City
Sports in Brooklyn
Sports competitions in New York City
Atlantic 10 men's basketball tournament
Atlantic 10 men's basketball tournament
2010s in Brooklyn
Prospect Heights, Brooklyn